Vic Raymer was the Second man on the Alberta Avenue CC curling team (from Edmonton, Alberta, Canada) during the World Curling Championships known as the 1961 Scotch Cup.

Raymer replaced Ron Anton on the team for the world championships, as Anton stayed home to concentrate on his studies.

References

External links

Curlers from Edmonton
World curling champions
Canadian male curlers
Year of birth missing